Abdérazak Hamad (born June 25, 1975) is an Algerian handballer, currently playing as a pivot for French second division side Pays d'Aix Université Club Handball. Hamad is a key member of the Algerian national handball team, which he has represented 101 times during his career.

Hamad was a member of the Algerian national team at the 2011 World Men's Handball Championship in Sweden.

References

External links
 Club Profile

1975 births
Living people
Algerian male handball players
Algerian expatriates in France
Expatriate handball players
21st-century Algerian people